Fixed–mobile convergence (FMC) is a change in telecommunications that removes differences between fixed and mobile networks.

In the 2004 press release announcing its formation, the Fixed-Mobile Convergence Alliance (FMCA) said:

Fixed Mobile Convergence is a transition point in the telecommunications industry that will finally remove the distinctions between fixed and mobile networks, providing a superior experience to customers by creating seamless services using a combination of fixed broadband and local access wireless technologies to meet their needs in homes, offices, other buildings and on the go.

In this definition "fixed broadband" means a connection to the Internet, such as DSL, cable or T1. "Local access wireless" means Wi-Fi or something like it. BT's initial FMC service, BT Fusion used Bluetooth rather than Wi-Fi for the local access wireless. The advent of picocells and femtocells means that local access wireless can be cellular radio technology.

The term "seamless services" in the quotation above is ambiguous. When talking about FMC, the word "seamless" usually refers to "seamless handover", which means that a call in progress can move from the mobile (cellular) network to the fixed network on the same phone without interruption, as described in one of the FMCA specification documents:

Seamless is defined as there being no perceptible break in voice or data transmission due to handover (from the calling party or the called party"s perspective).

The term "seamless services" sometimes means service equivalence across any termination point, fixed or mobile, so for example, dialing plans are identical and no change in dialed digits is needed on a desk phone versus a mobile. A less ambiguous term for this might be "network agnostic services".

The FMCA is a carrier organization, mainly oriented to consumer services. Enterprise phone systems are different. When Avaya announced its "Fixed Mobile Convergence" initiative in 2005, it was using a different definition. What Avaya and other PBX manufacturers were calling FMC was the ability for a PBX to treat a cell phone as an extension, and the ability for a cell phone to behave like a PBX extension phone:

Extension to Cellular technology: software seamlessly bridges office phone services to mobile devices, permitting the use of just one phone number and one voice mailbox. Client software extends the capabilities of the PBX to a mobile smartphone, creating a virtual desk extension. This software runs on Nokia Series 60 phones and works in conjunction with Extension to Cellular.

In other words, this new definition of FMC included neither local access wireless nor fixed broadband technology. The only defining characteristic it shared with the previous definition was seamless services, albeit without seamless handover.

Fixed–mobile convergence has not developed as expected, allegedly because of lack of demand. A paper published by the International Telecommunication Union (ITU) in 2007 also reaches a pessimistic conclusion.

See also 
 Quadruple play
 Technological convergence

References 

Wi-Fi
Computer networking